Shillelagh is a barony in County Wicklow, Republic of Ireland.

Etymology
Shillelagh barony derives its name from the Síol Elaigh, a local people who claimed descent from Élothach mac Fáelchon, and from the village of Shillelagh.

Location

Shillelagh barony is located in southwest County Wicklow.

History
Derived from Síol Elaigh, meaning descendants of Ealach. O'Dunlaing (O'Dowling) was noted as a chief of Síl n-Elathaig, a branch of the Síl Mella. The Ua Tuathail (O'Tooles) were driven here in the late 12th century, following the Cambro-Norman invasion.

List of settlements

Below is a list of settlements in Shillelagh barony:
Carnew
Coolboy
Shillelagh
Aghowle, a civil parish of the barony

References

Baronies of County Wicklow